The Foundling is the seventh studio album by Country artist Mary Gauthier.

Track listing
All tracks composed by Mary Gauthier; except where indicated

Personnel
Mary Gauthier - vocals, acoustic guitar
Jesse O'Brien - Wurlitzer, organ
Tania Elizabeth - fiddle
Ray Ferrugia - drums, percussion
Jaro Czerwinec - accordion
Danny Ellis - trombone
Margo Timmins - backing vocals
Josh Finlayson - guitar, bass, piano on "Mama Here, Mama Gone"; acoustic guitar on "Goodbye"
Garth Hudson - piano on "Sideshow"; keyboards, accordion on "Interlude 1" and "Interlude 2"
Ed Romanoff - acoustic guitar on "Blood is Blood" and "The Orphan King"
Michael Timmins - slide guitar on "March 11, 1962" and "Walk On the Water"

References

Mary Gauthier albums
2010 albums